Arvo is a Finnish and Estonian given name for males and may refer to:

Arvo Aalto (born 1932), Finnish politician 
Arvo Aaltonen (1892–1949), Finnish swimmer and Olympic medalist
Arvo Aller (born 1973), Estonian politician
Arvo Andresson (1954–1994), captain of 
Arvo Askola (1909–1975), Finnish track and field athlete and Olympic medalist
Arvo Haavisto (1900–1977), Finnish freestyle wrestler and Olympic medalist
Arvo Iho (born 1949), Estonian film director, cinematographer, actor and photographer 
Arvo Kraam (born 1971), Estonian football defender
Arvo Kuddo (born 1954), Estonian economist and politician
Arvo Kukumägi (1958–2017), Estonian actor
Arvo Nuut (1941–2021), Estonian film operator and film producer
Arvo Ojala (1920–2005), American actor
Arvo Pärt (born 1935), Estonian composer
Arvo Sainio (1921-1984), Finnish military officer and politician 
Arvo Salminen (1896–1967), Finnish Lutheran clergyman and politician
Arvo Salo (1932–2011), Finnish writer, journalist and politician
Arvo Sarapuu (1953–2020), Estonian politician and businessman
Arvo Sävelä (1908-1976), Finnish politician
Arvo Tuominen (1894–1981), Finnish revolutionary, journalist and politician
Arvo Turtiainen (1904-1980), Finnish writer 
Arvo Valton (born 1935), Estonian writer
Arvo Viitanen (1924–1999), Finnish cross-country skier and Olympic medalist
Arvo Viljanti (1900—1974), Finnish historian
Arvo Volmer (born 1962), Estonian conductor
Arvo Ylppö (1887–1992), Finnish pediatrician

See also 
 ARVØ (born 1992), German musician

Finnish masculine given names
Estonian masculine given names